Timur Shigabutdinov (born 12 January 1983) is a Russian racing driver, currently competing in the FIA European Rallycross Championship, Russian Circuit Racing Series and in the Can-Am X Race. In 2016, he finishing third in the standings at the FIA European Rallycross Championship (Super1600 category).

Racing career
Timur began his career in 2002 in the Russian Autocross Championship and Russian Autocross Cup, also raced in Russian Rallycross Cup and Russian Rallycross Championship, FIA European Rallycross Championship, FIA North European Zone Championship, Russian Racing Championship, Russian Circuit Racing Series, Russian Winter Ice Racing Cup and Russian Winter Ice Racing Championship, Tatarstan Circuit Racing Championship, Tatarstan Winter Ice Racing Cup and Tatarstan Winter Ice Racing Championship.

On 10 March 2019, it was announced that Timur will drive for Volland Racing for the 2019 FIA European Rallycross Championship season, to race at Audi A1s Super1600. Also he compete in the Russian Circuit Racing Series and Can-Am X Race with the TAIF Motorsport.

Racing record

Complete FIA European Rallycross Championship results
(key)

Super1600

* -15 championship points / Stewards decision - "Use of 3rd engine - taking in use more than 2 sealed engines in the championship".

Complete Russian Racing Championship results
(key) (Races in bold indicate pole position) (Races in italics indicate fastest lap)

National

Complete Russian Circuit Racing Series results
(key) (Races in bold indicate pole position) (Races in italics indicate fastest lap)

National

Touring

References

External links
 Profile at RCRS
 Profile at Can-Am X Race

Russian racing drivers
Russian Circuit Racing Series drivers
European Rallycross Championship drivers
Sportspeople from Kazan
1983 births
Living people